Angus Kennedy (born 1 March 1958) is a British actor in television and theatre.

Career
Kennedy trained at the Guildford School of Acting. He did repertory work at Watford, Farnham, Leatherhead, Hull, Huddersfield, Basingstoke, plus London's West End in Number One at the Queens Theatre London, and Saki at the Gate Theatre, He has done theatre tours all over Europe in Animal Farm, The Mousetrap and School for Scandal. His has appeared regularly on TV. He was dubbed into German for a role in the Rosamund Pilcher adaptation Flamme Der Liebe (Flame of Love) for German television.
Between 2005 and 2008, he filmed three series of the internationally successful series Genie in the House for Nickelodeon, in which he played Max Baxter (Uncle Max). He played Mr Kingston in the feature film Pride and Prejudice and Zombies and Jeffrey in the feature film Allied starring Brad Pitt, directed by Robert Zemeckis. He is Chief Insp Mort in the feature film Intrigo: Death of an Author directed by Daniel Alfredson. He played the GP the BBC series Back to Life. and he filmed the role of Governor Wilkes in the Sci Fi film Snowflakes. Between 2019 and 2020 he filmed the zombie thriller Alive directed by David Marantz which was interrupted by the COVID-19 lockdown and took nearly a year to complete. He is the Heathrow cop Thicker in the US feature film The Statistical Probability of Love at First Sight and is the British Prime Minister in the second series of the Amazon series The Power and is also in the Netflix Neil Gaiman series Sandman.

Angus resides in Guildford, Surrey and is married to Sue, a make up artist, and has two boys, Neil and Rory. Rory is an actor.

References

External links
Genie In The House Official Site

1958 births
Living people
English male stage actors
English male television actors
People from Malmesbury
Male actors from Wiltshire